Michael David Doe (born 24 December 1947) is the Preacher of Gray's Inn and a former Bishop of Swindon.

Doe was born in Lymington, Hants, and grew up on the Highfield Council Estate there.  He attended Brockenhurst Grammar School and went on to Durham University (Bachelor of Arts {BA(Hons)}). After studying at Ripon Hall, Oxford, he was ordained priest in 1973 in Southwark Cathedral. He was a curate on the St Helier Estate in South London, after which he was National Youth Secretary at the British Council of Churches.  He moved to Oxford in 1981 to be Priest Missioner in the Blackbird Leys Ecumenical Partnership, and also served as Rural Dean of Cowley from 1987-1989. During this time he co-presented the weekly religious affairs programme on BBC Radio Oxford: "Spirit Level". He was then Social Responsibility Advisor to the Diocese of Portsmouth and a canon residentiary (later, Acting Provost) at Portsmouth Cathedral, before his ordination to the episcopate in 1994 when he became the first Bishop of Swindon, in the Diocese of Bristol. After ten years in this post he was appointed, in 2004, the General Secretary of the mission agency United Society for the Propagation of the Gospel   On retirement in 2011 he became Preacher to Gray's Inn, one of the four Inns of Court in London. He is an Assistant Bishop in the Diocese of Southwark, and an Honorary Minor Canon of Southwark Cathedral.   He chaired the Ecumenical Council for Corporate Responsibility from 2012 to 2015. In 2002 he was awarded an honorary doctorate from the University of Bath. His publications include "Seeking the Truth in Love - the Church and Homosexuality" (DLT 2000), "Today!" (USPG 2009), and "Saving Power - the Mission of God and the Anglican Communion" (SPCK 2011).

References

1947 births
Alumni of St John's College, Durham
Alumni of Ripon College Cuddesdon
20th-century Church of England bishops
21st-century Church of England bishops
Living people
Bishops of Swindon (previously Malmesbury)